Ifrane Airport  is an airport serving Ifrane, a town in the Fès-Meknès region in Morocco.

Facilities

References

External links
 
 

Airports in Morocco
Buildings and structures in Fès-Meknès